Joy Allen (born 10 November 1948) is an English actress best known for her television appearances, including several episodes of the sitcom Archie Bunker's Place.

Early life 
Allen was born in Werrington, Cambridgeshire. She trained at the Royal Academy of Dramatic Art.

Career 
She has appeared in several television roles including in Dad's Army, Are You Being Served?, Archie Bunker's Place, Oh, Doctor Beeching! and 'Allo 'Allo!.

Filmography

Film

Television

References
Croft, David; Perry, Jimmy; Webber, Richard (2000). The Complete A-Z of Dads Army. Orion.

External links

Alumni of RADA
English television actresses
Living people
People from Peterborough
Actresses from Cambridgeshire
1948 births